Moisés Baute Curbelo (born 29 August 1984) is a Spanish heavyweight kickboxer. He is the former Enfusion heavyweight champion. Baute previously fought in the SUPERKOMBAT Fighting Championship, where he was two-time championship challenger.

Kickboxing career
Baute fought during Enfusion 7, when he faced a Portuguese kickboxer Luis Morais. Baute won the fight by knockout.

In June 2014, Baute participated in the SUPERKOMBAT World Grand Prix III 2014 cruiserweight tournament. In the semi finals he defeated Cristian Ristea by TKO. In the finals he defeated Michael Terrill by TKO.

He then challenged Andrei Stoica for the SUPERKOMBAT Super Cruiserweight title. Baute lost the fight by TKO.

During Strikers League he fought Nassim Ballhor. Baute won by a second round KO.

He fought once more for Enfusion during Enfusion 81, when he faced against Mathieu Kongolo. Moises won the fight by a second round KO.

In his next Enfusion fight he challenged for the heavyweight title against Mohamed Boubkari. He won the fight in the first round by KO.

His last fight of 2019 was against Bruno Susano for ISKA World title. Baute won a majority decision.

Baute was scheduled to participate in a ONE Championship tournament held at Road to ONE: Strikers Cage Championship 7. He won the tournament with a TKO victory against Christian Brorhilker in the semifinals and a decision victory against David Trallero in the finals.

Championships and accomplishments
International Sport Karate Association
ISKA World Oriental Rules Super Cruiserweight Championship 
Enfusion
Enfusion Heavyweight Championship
SUPERKOMBAT Fighting Championship
SUPERKOMBAT World Grand Prix III 2014 Cruiserweight Tournament Winner

Kickboxing record

|-
|-  bgcolor="#CCFFCC"
| 2021-06-26 || Win||align=left| David Trallero  || Road to ONE: Strikers Cage Championship 7, Tournament Final || Tenerife, Spain || Decision || 3 || 3:00
|-  bgcolor="#CCFFCC"
| 2021-06-26 || Win||align=left| Christian Brorhilker || Road to ONE: Strikers Cage Championship 7, Tournament Semifinal || Tenerife, Spain || TKO || 2 ||
|-  bgcolor="#CCFFCC"
| 2019-11-23|| Win||align=left| Bruno Susano || ISKA La Tenerife || Tenerife, Spain || Decision (Majority) || 5 || 3:00
|-
! style=background:white colspan=9 |
|-
|-  bgcolor="#CCFFCC"
| 2019-10-26 || Win||align=left| Mohamed Boubkari || Enfusion 89 || Wuppertal, Germany ||  Decision  (Unanimous) || 5 || 3:00
|-
! style=background:white colspan=9 |
|-
|-  bgcolor="#CCFFCC"
| 2019-09-21 || Win||align=left| David Trallero || Slam Arena || Gran Canaria, Spain ||  Decision (Unanimous) || 3 || 3:00
|-
|-  bgcolor="#CCFFCC"
| 2019-03-30 || Win||align=left| Mathieu Kongolo || Enfusion 81 || Wuppertal, Germany ||  TKO (Punches) || 2 || 3:00
|-
|-  bgcolor="#CCFFCC"
| 2017-05-20 || Win||align=left| Nassim Balhor || Strikers League || Tenerife, Spain ||  KO (Punch) || 2 || 3:00
|-
|-  bgcolor="#FFBBBB"
| 2016-05-07 || Loss||align=left| César Almeida || SUPERKOMBAT World Grand Prix II 2016 || Bucharest, Romania ||  Decision (Majority) || 5 || 3:00
|-
! style=background:white colspan=9 |
|-
|-  bgcolor="#FFBBBB"
| 2015-04-18 || Loss||align=left| Mohamed Boubkari || Enfusion 27 || Tenerife, Spain || TKO (Corner stoppage) || 2 || 
|-
|-  bgcolor="#FFBBBB"
| 2014-10-25 || Loss||align=left| Andrei Stoica || SUPERKOMBAT World Grand Prix 2014 Final Elimination || Geneva, Switzerland ||  TKO (Punches) || 3 || 2:30
|-
! style=background:white colspan=9 |
|-
|-  bgcolor="#CCFFCC"
| 2014-06-21 || Win||align=left| Michael Terrill|| SUPERKOMBAT World Grand Prix III 2014, Final || Constanta, Romania ||  TKO (Body Punches) || 2 ||
|-
! style=background:white colspan=9 |
|-
|-  bgcolor="#CCFFCC"
| 2014-06-21 || Win||align=left| Cristian Ristea|| SUPERKOMBAT World Grand Prix III 2014, Semi Finals || Constanta, Romania ||  TKO (Punches) || 3||
|-
|-  bgcolor="#fbb"
| 2014-03-22|| Loss ||align=left| Igor Bugaenko|| FCK || Tenerife, Spain ||  Decision (Unanimous) || 3|| 3:00
|-  bgcolor="#CCFFCC"
| 2013-11-09 || Win||align=left| Animal Souza ||  || Tenerife, Spain || TKO (Knees) || 1 ||
|-  bgcolor="#CCFFCC"
| 2013-07-13 || Win||align=left| Luis Morais || Enfusion 7 || Tenerife, Spain ||  KO (Punch) || 1 ||
|-  bgcolor="#CCFFCC"
| 2013-04-13 || Win||align=left| Alberto ||  || Tenerife, Spain ||  KO (Left hook) || 1 ||
|-  bgcolor="#fbb"
| 2011-09-25 || Loss ||align=left| Rustemi Kreshnik || BFN Group & Music Hall presents: It's Showtime "Fast & Furious 70MAX" || Brussels, Belgium ||  KO (Right Hook) || 2 || 1:41
|-
| colspan=9 | Legend:

See also
List of male kickboxers

References

1984 births
Living people
SUPERKOMBAT kickboxers
Sportspeople from Santa Cruz de Tenerife
Heavyweight kickboxers